Andy Murray was the defending champion, and won in the final 6–1, 6–1, against Andrey Golubev.

Seeds

Draw

Finals

Top half

Bottom half

External links
Draw
Qualifying draw

St. Petersburg Open - Singles
St. Petersburg Open
St. Petersburg Open - Singles